"Your Cheating Art" is an episode of the BBC sitcom The Green Green Grass. It was screened on 5 February 2009, as the fifth episode of the fourth series. This episode was written by John Sullivan.

Synopsis
Marlene is worried about Tyler, who is in a deep depression and on what appears to be a starvation diet. Mrs Cakeworthy, meanwhile, discovers the reason why Tyler is withdrawn and spending every hour painting gloomy pictures. She has 'found' a letter from his girlfriend, Beth, in which she says she wants to finish with him. Marlene is distraught and even tries enlisting help from Jed and Bryan to help her little boy come to terms with a broken heart. Maybe Dora can help?

Episode Cast

References

External links
British TV Comedy Guide for The Green Green Grass
BARB viewing figures

2009 British television episodes
The Green Green Grass episodes